Phenylobacterium falsum is a Gram negative, strictly aerobic and rod-shaped bacterium from the genus of Phenylobacterium which has been isolated from alkaline groundwater from Cabeço de Vide in Portugal.

References

Caulobacterales
Bacteria described in 2005